The Celtic League is a pan-Celtic organisation, founded in 1961, that aims to promote modern Celtic identity and culture in Ireland, Scotland, Wales, Brittany, Cornwall and the Isle of Man – referred to as the Celtic nations; it places particular emphasis on promoting the Celtic languages of those nations. It also advocates further self-governance in the Celtic nations and ultimately for each nation to be an independent state in its own right. The Celtic League is an accredited NGO with roster consultative status to the United Nations Economic and Social Council (EcoSoc).

Aims
The Celtic League presents its aims as including:  
 "Fostering co-operation between Celtic peoples."
 "Developing the consciousness of the special relationship and solidarity between them."
 "Making our national struggles and achievements better known abroad."
 "Campaigning for a formal association of Celtic nations to take place once two or more of them have achieved self-government."
 "Advocating the use of the national resources of each of the Celtic countries for the benefit of all its people."

"Each Celtic nation is conditioned by a different history and so we must not expect uniformity of thought, but instead allow diversity to express itself within the Celtic League. In this way, we may better recognise those areas of possible co-operation and eventually formulate a detailed common policy. With this we can work out which kind of relations between our communities will enable them to enjoy freedoms and liberties at both individual and community level."

Politically, the Celtic league seeks to create six sovereign states from the six Celtic nations it acknowledges as existing, associated in some way. There is some variation in the understanding of these aims, which ranges from annual general meetings (AGMs), to an actual federation along the lines of the Nordic Council.

The 1987 Celtic League Annual General Meeting stated that it: "firmly reiterates that the Celtic League has a specific function within Celtia, i.e. to work for the reinstatement of our languages to a viable position, and the attainment of sufficient economic, cultural and political autonomy to guarantee the survival of our civilisation into the 21st century. This emphasis on the languages of our six nations marks us now as distinct cultural communities, and therefore as distinct nations."

History
Founded in 1961, the present Celtic League grew out of various other pan-Celtic organisations, particularly the Celtic Congress, but with a more political emphasis. Previously, Hugh MacDiarmid and others had suggested something along the same lines.

The Celtic League was started at the 1961 National Eisteddfod of Wales, which was held at Rhosllannerchrugog near Wrexham in northeast Wales. Two of the founding members were Gwynfor Evans and J. E. Jones, who were respectively president and secretary-general of the Welsh nationalist political party Plaid Cymru at the time. Interest was expressed by Scottish parties, and also by Breton nationalists.

Branches

There are six main, national branches of the Celtic League in the six Celtic countries, generally known by the Celtic language names of their countries: Ireland is known as Éire, Scotland as Alba, Wales as Cymru, Brittany as Breizh, Cornwall as Kernow and the Isle of Man as Mannin or Mann.

When concluding against the inclusion of the historically Celtic regions Galicia and Asturias (Asturies) in Spain, the 1987 Celtic League Annual General Meeting stated that, because the Celtic League's specific function, "to work for the reinstatement of our languages ... and the attainment of ... political autonomy", must remain undiluted, "this AGM considers that it would be condescending and inappropriate to offer a limited status to the applicant nations [i.e., Galicia and Asturias] within the Celtic League."  The AGM expressed that it "encourage[s] them in their efforts to develop the Celtic elements in their heritage" such that "from such areas, might come the support and understanding we need to pursue our aims more effectively" (in Spain, there are no surviving Celtic languages, although in Galicia there is a minority nationalist movement which seeks independence from the Spanish Kingdom and promotes a Celtic identity as a fundamental aspect of Galician culture).

There are various diaspora branches, that play little part in the annual general meetings:

A Patagonian branch was founded in the Chubut River Valley, Argentina (the location of y Wladfa, a Welsh colony), at the end of 2009; it remained active , with Mónica Jones as secretary and her husband Michael Jones filling an unspecified post.

Celtic League, American Branch (CLAB) was founded in New York City in 1974, and has its own newsletter, but reported decreased activity , the same year its domain name, CelticLeague.org, was lost to a cybersquatter.  CLAB organized various annual events, including the Pan-Celtic Conference.

There is a generalized International Branch for "[t]hose living far away from the national branches", including prospective Spanish members in Galicia and Asturias; it was active with a website, Celtic-League.org (operated from the Isle of Man), from 2004 through 2010. There has been a separate England Branch, based in London, active at least from 2004 to 2007. There used to be a branch in Cape Breton Island, Canada, where a small Scottish Gaelic-speaking community still exists; this branch was moribund , though various consultations had taken place in efforts to restart it. The branch was then recorded as being active by 22 January 2015.

Publications
The Celtic League publishes a quarterly magazine, Carn, which highlights political struggles and cultural preservation issues. The articles are produced in the six Celtic languages in addition to English. The cover of the magazine is a map of the six Celtic countries with their respective Celtic-language names beside them. In the past, articles have appeared in French as well. For many years, Carn claimed to be the only regular publication carrying all six Celtic languages.

The Celtic League, American Branch (CLAB) prints its own quarterly newsletter, Six Nations, One Soul,  which provides news of branch activities and events within the Celtic communities in the United States, publishes letters from members, and reviews books and recordings of Celtic interest.  CLAB published at least six issues of a larger semi-annual magazine, Keltoi: A Pan-Celtic Review,from 2006 to 2008. CLAB also produced a wall calendar each year, with art from members, appropriate quotations, and anniversaries; publication ceased with the 2008 issue.

Other branches have published their own periodicals from time to time, but few have been very long-lived.

Notable members and former members
Some of the more notable past and present members of the Celtic League have been Plaid Cymru leaders Gwynfor Evans and J. E. Jones, Scottish National Party leaders Winnie Ewing, Robert McIntyre and Rob Gibson, leader of Sinn Féin Ruairí Ó Brádaigh, prominent Breton exiles Yann Fouéré and Alan Heusaff, the historian and writer Peter Berresford Ellis, writer Bernard Le Nail, and Manx language revivalist Brian Stowell.

American author and linguist Alexei Kondratiev was president of the Celtic League American branch.

Campaigns
The Celtic League also campaigns for a united Ireland, and the return of the Loire-Atlantique department to Brittany. Over the years, the Celtic League has campaigned consistently in support of the languages in Celtic nations, and for the return of ancient artefacts, removed from Celtic countries to museums outside of these areas – amongst these are the Lewis chessmen and the Chronicles of Mann.

The Manx branch of the Celtic League successfully campaigned for the Calf of Man island to be transferred from the National Trust of England, Wales and Northern Ireland to the local Manx National Heritage.

In the mid-1990s, the Celtic League started a campaign to have the word "Alba" on the Scottish football and rugby tops. Since 2005, the Scottish Football Association have supported the use of Scottish Gaelic on their teams's strip in recognition of the language's revival in Scotland. However, the SRU is still being lobbied to have "Alba" on the national rugby strip.

The Celtic League has also passed a motion to support the general aims of Independence First, which aims for a referendum on Scottish independence.

In 2010, the Celtic League sought to prevent retailers selling the flag of England in Cornwall, criticising it as "foreign".

Political status of countries
The political status of the Celtic League's suggested six Celtic nations varies widely. Both the UK and France were traditionally very centralised states.

The following Celtic nations have some degree of autonomy, although Ireland consists of the territory of two sovereign states:
 Ireland:
 Republic of Ireland (26 counties) – independent.
 Northern Ireland (6 counties) – has a devolved assembly. Was ruled directly by the United Kingdom from 1972 to 1998. From 1922 to 1972 Northern Ireland had had its own parliament, but due to the worsening political violence of The Troubles the British army was deployed to the region and direct rule established.  Under the 1998 Good Friday Agreement some autonomy and various provisions were granted on a power-sharing basis. Until 2007 various controversies between Unionists and Republicans had caused the government of the United Kingdom to rule directly. Northern Ireland now has its own devolved Assembly since 1998.
 The Isle of Man – under home rule as a British Crown Dependency. Although controlled by the UK, it is not officially part of it.
 Scotland – has had a devolved Parliament since 1999, but voted against becoming an independent country in a 2014 referendum.
 Wales – has a devolved Parliament which was renamed in May 2020 from the "National Assembly for Wales", to "Senedd Cymru" or "the Welsh Parliament", simply referred to as the "Senedd". It has had a devolved institution since 1999.

There is also a campaign for a Cornish Assembly. In 2000 the Cornish Constitutional Convention launched the Declaration for a Cornish Assembly campaign. In less than two years, more than 50,000 people signed the Assembly petition and Lord Whitty, in the House of Lords, recognised that Cornwall has a "special case" for devolution. On a visit to Cornwall, John Prescott said "Cornwall has the strongest regional identity in the UK."

Three of the countries are completely within the United Kingdom, one partially, and another is a British dependency. Brittany is part of the French state, and does not have any legislative autonomy, but four départements have some financial autonomy as one of the Regions of France, whilst the fifth département is in another French region. The Republic of Ireland is completely independent.

Posts
Nationality is indicated by letters after their names as so:
B – Breton, C – Cornish, I – Irish, M – Manx, S – Scottish, W – Welsh

An arrow indicates the editor relocated to one of the other Celtic countries.

General secretaries
Alan Heusaff: (1961–84),  B→I
Bernard Moffatt: (1984–88), M
Davyth Fear: (1988–90), C
Séamas Ó Coileáin: (1990–91), I
Bernard Moffat: (1991–2006), M
Rhisiart Tal-e-bot: (2006 – present), W→C

Editors of Carn (Established 1973)
Frang MacThòmais: (1973–74), S
Pádraig Ó Snodaigh: (1974–77), I
Cathal Ó Luain: (1977–81), I
Pedyr Pryor: (1981–84), C
Pat Bridson: (1984-2013), M→I
Rhisiart Tal-e-bot: (2013–present), C

Other posts
The presidency and vice-presidency ran from 1961 to 1971 and were then abolished. They were held by Gwynfor Evans (W) and Robert McIntyre (S) respectively for the entire duration of the posts. The successor post, chairman, was held by Pádraig Ó Conchúir (I) from 1972 to 1978, then abolished.

J. B. Moffatt was serving as the organisation's director of information .

See also 

 Celtic union
 Pan-Celticism
 List of movements in Wales

References

 Ellis, Peter Berresford The Celtic Dawn
 Tanner, Marcus Last of the Celts

External links
 Celtic League Website

1961 establishments in Wales
Celtic nationalism
Cultural organisations based in the United Kingdom
Endangered languages projects
Home rule in the United Kingdom
Inter-Celtic organisations
Organizations established in 1961
Political advocacy groups in the United Kingdom
Politics of Brittany
Politics of Cornwall
Politics of Ireland
Politics of Scotland
Politics of the Isle of Man
Politics of Wales